Luo Lirong is a Chinese artist and sculptor who creates realistic sculptures, primarily in bronze.

Biography 
Luo was born in 1980 in Hongqi, Hunan province, China.

In 1998, Luo entered the Changsha Academy of Arts in Changsha, Hunan and studied with Xiao Xiaoqiu.
From 2000 to 2005 she studied sculpture at the CAFA (Central Academy of Fine Arts in Beijing, China) with Sun Jiabo. In 2005, she graduated with honors. While at the CAFA, Luo participated in multiple public sculpting projects including a sculpture installed in 2003 in Dalian Park for the 2008 Olympic Games in Beijing.

In 2005 Luo traveled to France and in 2006, she and her husband moved to Belgium, where they lived until 2017. In 2018, Luo opened the Luo Lirong Foundry in Bologna, Italy.

Works 

2016
 Bonheur simple, 5.9 x 7.5 x 5.5 inch, bronze sculpture
 L'Arrivée du jour, 43.3 x 20.9 x 18.9 inch, bronze sculpture
 Ligne de ton dos, 6.3 x 13.4 x 5.1 inch, bronze sculpture
 Je me souviens de toi, 11.8 x 10.2 x 4.7 inch, bronze sculpture

2017
 L'Arrivée du jour (sans feuille), 43.3 x 20.9 x 18.9 inch, bronze sculpture
 La mélodie oubliée, 205 x 85 x 85 cm, bronze sculpture

2018
 Vol Haut, 35 x 20.9 x 16.9 inch, bronze sculpture

References

External links 
 Luo Lirong on Instagram.com
 Luo Lirong at Gallery Art Center Horus
 Luo Lirong at Galeries Bartoux
 Luo Lirong at Artpeoplegallery.com

Chinese sculptors
Bronze sculptures
Living people
1980 births